Glen John Murray (born November 1, 1972) is a Canadian former professional ice hockey right winger who played 16 seasons in the National Hockey League (NHL) with the Boston Bruins, Pittsburgh Penguins and Los Angeles Kings. He is currently the Director of Player Development for the Kings.

Playing career
Born in Halifax, Nova Scotia, Murray was raised in the Bridgewater area and played junior hockey for the Sudbury Wolves of the Ontario Hockey League (OHL). Murray spent three seasons with the Wolves, putting up 84 points in his final year.

Murray was a first-round draft pick, 18th overall by the Bruins in the 1991 NHL Entry Draft. He spent four seasons with the Bruins before being traded to the Pittsburgh Penguins with Bryan Smolinski for Kevin Stevens and Shawn McEachern. Murray's stay with the Penguins only lasted a little over a year and he was eventually on the move again; this time he was traded to Los Angeles Kings for Ed Olczyk. Murray enjoyed moderate success with the Kings, picking up some good numbers during his five-year stay, but on October 24, 2001, Murray would once again find himself in the middle of a trade. Murray was traded back to the Boston Bruins with Jozef Stümpel for Jason Allison and Mikko Eloranta.

In July 2002, Murray signed a two-year contract with the Bruins.

Murray enjoyed his greatest offensive season in 2002–03, scoring 92 points (44 goals and 48 assists) for the Bruins and earning a spot in the 2003 NHL All-Star Game.

In August 2005, Murray signed a four-year, $16.6 million contract extension with the Bruins.

In November 2008, Murray had ankle surgery, claiming it was a result of an injury he sustained during play of the 2007–08 NHL season. As a result, his agent filed a claim against the Boston Bruins. The Bruins ended up winning arbitration and on July 23, 2008, Murray was placed on waivers by the Bruins. Three days later, on July 26, the Bruins announced the buyout of Murray's contract to free up salary cap room.

Awards
Selected to two NHL All-Star games: 2003, 2004

Career statistics

Regular season and playoffs

International

See also
 List of NHL players with 1000 games played

References

External links

 

1972 births
Living people
Boston Bruins draft picks
Boston Bruins players
Canadian ice hockey right wingers
Canadian people of Scottish descent
Ice hockey people from Nova Scotia
Los Angeles Kings coaches
Los Angeles Kings players
National Hockey League All-Stars
National Hockey League first-round draft picks
People from Bridgewater, Nova Scotia
Pittsburgh Penguins players
Providence Bruins players
Sportspeople from Halifax, Nova Scotia
Sudbury Wolves players
Canadian ice hockey coaches